West Angeles Church of God in Christ is a Pentecostal megachurch located in the West Adams Historic District of Los Angeles, California, and a member of the Church of God in Christ.

History
It was founded by Elder Clarence E. Church in 1943. The first sanctuary was located on Adams Boulevard, near Interstate 10, known locally as the Santa Monica Freeway. In 1969, after Elder Church's death, Charles E. Blake took over as the pastor of West Angeles. 

The sanctuary has moved twice, first to a 1,000-seat facility located at 3045 Crenshaw Boulevard, and then to the present structure, the 5,000-seat West Angeles Cathedral at 3600 Crenshaw Boulevard in 1999. Under Blake's leadership, the church grew from 40 members to over 24,000.

In 2019, it sold its buildings at 3045 Crenshaw Boulevard to fund the construction of a Family Life Center behind the building at 3600 Crenshaw Boulevard. 

In 2022, Charles Blake II became senior pastor.

References

External links
 West Angeles Church of God in Christ official site.

Churches in Los Angeles
Pentecostal churches in California
Church of God in Christ
Evangelical megachurches in the United States
Megachurches in California
West Adams, Los Angeles
African-American churches